Bhupendra Narayan Mandal University (B. N. Mandal University) is the state government university situated at  district headquarters, Madhepura. B. N. Mandal University, Madhepura came into existence on the 10th of January, 1992. It acts as an affiliating institution and offers undergraduate, graduate and PhD programs through its constituents, affiliated colleges, and institutes in Madhepura and nearby cities.
The university conducts various vocational and technical courses in Science, commerce, and arts and also in engineering and Medical science.

Colleges
Its jurisdiction extends over three districts - Madhepura, Saharsa, Supaul.

Affiliated colleges
 Adarsh College, Madhepura
 K B Women's College, Madhepura
 Madhepura College, Madhepura
 Milliar Faqurudin Ali Ahmad T P College, Madhepura
 R P M College MAdhepura
 ST.A K N Degree College, Madhepura
 U V K College, Madhepura
 Banwari Shankar College, Saharsa
 Evening College, Saharsa
 Lakshminath College, Saharsa
 S N S Mahila College, Supaul
 Anuplal Yadav College, Supaul
 K N Degree College, Supaul
 National Degree College, Supaul
Araria college, Araria
BSS COLLEGE, Supaul

Constituent colleges
 Parwati Science College, Madhepura
 Maharaja Hariballabh Memorial College, Saharsa
 Kamleshwari Prasad College, Murliganj, Madhepura
 T. P. College, Madhepura
 Manohar Lal Tekriwal College, Saharsa
 Ramesh Jha Mahila College, Saharsa
 Rajendra Mishra College, Saharsa
 Ravinandan Mishra Memorial Law College, Saharsa
 Sarb Narain Singh Ram Kumar Singh College, Saharsa
 Bharat Sewak Samaj College, Supaul
 Hari Prasad Shah College, Supaul
 Lalit Narayan Mishra Smarak College, Supaul
Law College, Madhepura

Medical Colleges
 Lord Buddha Koshi Medical College and Hospital
 Mata Gujri Memorial Medical College(now Deemed)

Teachers Training Colleges
 M.P College of Education
 Radhe Shyam Teachers Training College, Supaul

Notable alumni
Minhajul Arfin Azad, Bengali politician

 
Universities in Bihar
Madhepura district
Educational institutions established in 1992
1992 establishments in Bihar